Wimp, WIMP, or Wimps may refer to:

Science and technology
 Weakly interacting massive particle, a hypothetical particle of dark matter
 WIMP (computing), the "window, icon, menu, pointer" paradigm
 WIMP (software bundle), the web stack of Windows, IIS, MySQL, and PHP/Perl/Python

Arts and entertainment
 WiMP, a defunct music streaming service
 WURH-CD (former call signs WIMP-LP, WIMP-CA, and WIMP-CD), a television station licensed to serve Miami, Florida, US
 Wimps (band), a US punk rock band
 Wimp, played by Rick Lawless, a character on the TV sitcom Herman's Head

People
 Wimp Sanderson (born 1937), retired basketball coach known as "Wimp"
 Kay Davis or Katherine McDonald Wimp (1920–2012), jazz singer
 Mary Baumgartner, also known as "Wimp" (1930–2018), former female baseball catcher
derogatory term for a coward

See also
 Farkle (Wimp Out), a dice game that has also been called or is similar to 1000/5000/10000, Cosmic Wimpout, Greed, Hot Dice, Squelch, Zilch, or Zonk
 "The Diary of Horace Wimp", a track on the Electric Light Orchestra album Discovery
 WIMP Argon Programme, a cold dark matter experiment at Laboratori Nazionali del Gran Sasso, Italy
 Wimpy (disambiguation)

ru:WIMP